William Hawkins (October 10, 1777May 17, 1819) was the 17th Governor of the U.S. state of North Carolina from 1811 to 1814.

Early life and education
William Hawkins was born at his family plantation, called Pleasant Hill, in what is today Vance County, North Carolina; he was one of twelve children born by his mother Lucy Davis Hawkins. His father, Philemon Hawkins III, was a planter and member of the North Carolina General Assembly. As a young man, Hawkins studied law in North Carolina under Judge John Williams and at Princeton University.

Career
Hawkins worked for two years in Georgia with the Creek people as an Indian agent under his uncle, Benjamin Hawkins, US Supervisor of Southeast Indian tribes. After that, he returned to North Carolina to practice law. In 1801, he was assigned by Gov. James Turner to settle a dispute and arrange a settlement with those Tuscarora Indians remaining in Bertie County, North Carolina. (The great majority of the tribe had migrated to New York state by 1722, where they settled with the Oneida people of the Iroquois Confederacy.) 

In 1804, Hawkins was elected to the North Carolina House of Commons from Warren County and served a single term. In 1809, he was elected as a representative from Granville County; he served until 1811. From 1810 to 1811, he was Speaker of the House.

In December 1811, Hawkins was elected as Governor of North Carolina by the General Assembly. He served the constitutional limit of three terms, which coincided with the duration of the War of 1812 through 1814. During the war, he supported the military efforts of the federal government and assisted in raising a volunteer militia of 7,000 troops.

Hawkins retired from politics after the end of his term as governor, except for one term in the House of Commons in 1817. He died in 1819 and is buried in Sparta, Georgia.

Personal life
After getting started at work, Hawkins in 1803 married Anne Swepson Boyd of Mecklenburg County, Virginia. They had six children together.

Notes

External links
North Carolina Historical Marker

1777 births
1819 deaths
People from Vance County, North Carolina
North Carolina Democratic-Republicans
Governors of North Carolina
Members of the North Carolina House of Representatives
Democratic-Republican Party state governors of the United States